Kiihtelysvaara is a former municipality of Finland. On 1 January 2005 it was consolidated, together with Tuupovaara, with the city of Joensuu.

It is located in the province of Eastern Finland and is part of the North Karelia region. The municipality had a population of 2,681 (2003) and covered an area of 530.85 km2 of which 43.76 is water. The population density was 5.1 inhabitants per km2.

The municipality was unilingually Finnish.

External links 

Populated places disestablished in 2005
Former municipalities of Finland
Joensuu